The Waldorf Astoria Shanghai on the Bund is a luxury hotel located along The Bund, in Shanghai's Huangpu District, in China. Part of the Waldorf Astoria Hotels & Resorts chain, the hotel is housed within the Shanghai Club Building.

References

External links

 
 Waldorf Astoria Shanghai on the Bund at Waldorf Astioria

Hotels established in 2010
Hotels in Shanghai
The Bund